Microkayla iatamasi is a species of frog in the family Strabomantidae. It is endemic to Bolivia and only known from near its type locality at the northern limit of the Carrasco National Park, Cochabamba Department, at elevations of  asl.
Its natural habitats are cloud forest, elfin forest, and humid páramo. It is considered to be an abundant species within its small distribution area.  The latter makes it susceptible to stochastic events. In addition, climate change is a potential threat.

References

Amphibians of the Andes
Amphibians of Bolivia
Endemic fauna of Bolivia
Páramo fauna
Taxonomy articles created by Polbot
Amphibians described in 2001